Golda Och Academy is a private Jewish day school that offers secular and religious education for Jewish children from pre-kindergarten through twelfth grade at two campuses in West Orange in Essex County, New Jersey, United States. Until June 2011 the school was called Solomon Schechter Day School of Essex and Union. The school primarily serves families in Essex and Union counties, but attracts students from all over northern and central New Jersey and also New York.

As of the 2019–20 school year, the school had an enrollment of 464 students and 61.3 classroom teachers (on an FTE basis), for a student–teacher ratio of 7.6:1. The school's student body was 96.3% (447) White, 1.5% (7) two or more races, 1.3% (6) Hispanic, 0.4% (2) Asian, 0.2% (1) Black and 0.2% (1) Native Hawaiian / Pacific Islander.

On July 1, 2021, Rabbi Danny Nevins became the 8th Head of School, succeeding Adam Shapiro. Also on that date, Dr. Eytan Apter became the Upper School Principal. Ms. Carrie Siegel is the Lower School principal.

History

The school first opened in September 1965 at Congregation Beth Shalom in Union, New Jersey, having been founded by its rabbi, Elvin I. Kose, along with Horace Bier and Nat Winter.  The first classes were kindergarten and a first grade consisting of 18 children. A new grade was added each year for the initial class, and the first class of nine students graduated from the high school in 1977. This was the first high school affiliated with the Solomon Schechter Day School Association.

The school moved into its own facilities in 1979 for the first time with the acquisition of the former Roosevelt School in Cranford. Classes were held in various locations in Union and Essex counties. That was followed seven years later in 1986 by the purchase of the Irving Laurie Building in West Orange. In September 1991, the Upper School moved into a newly constructed building on Pleasant Valley Way in West Orange, which in 1995 became the Eric F. Ross Campus.

The Lower School completed a $7 million renovation that began in 2012, which included an expansion of the building, building of a new wing and refurbishment of existing spaces. Project highlights included the addition of a science discovery lab and outdoor classroom and garden, a new technology lab, synagogue, playground, library, and cafeteria; creation of a specialty space for art and music; updated and wired classrooms; and increased accessibility.

Beginning in 2014, Golda Och Academy has increased its Science, Technology, Engineering and Mathematics (collectively STEM) programming, including a new STEM class, an award-winning Robotics club the CodeRunners, and more. In January 2015, the school announced plans for a state-of-the-art STEM facility which was completed in September 2015.

Golda Och Academy has over 1,800 alumni.

Accreditation

The school is accredited by the Solomon Schechter Day School Association and the New Jersey Association of Independent Schools. It exceeds New Jersey Core Curriculum Content Standards. Golda Och Academy is a beneficiary agency of the Jewish Federation of Greater MetroWest New Jersey and the United Synagogue of Conservative Judaism.

Athletics

The Golda Och Academy Road Runners compete in the Super Essex Conference, following a reorganization of sports leagues in Northern New Jersey by the New Jersey State Interscholastic Athletic Association (NJSIAA). With 95 students in grades 10-12, the school was classified by the NJSIAA for the 2019–20 school year as Non-Public B for most athletic competition purposes, which included schools with an enrollment of 37 to 366 students in that grade range (equivalent to Group I for public schools).

Sports include; Soccer, Tennis, Volleyball, Cross-Country, Swimming and Basketball for both boys and girls on a middle school or varsity level. Baseball and Softball are offered as well as a new Lacrosse club.

In 2013, the school's gymnasium was dedicated in honor of gym teacher and coach Sandy Pyonin in celebration of his 40 years at SSDS/GOA. Pyonin has trained more than 30 professional basketball players including Kyrie Irving.

Notable alumni

 Jessica Antiles (born 1996, class of 2015), competitive swimmer.
 Rachel Antonoff (born 1981), fashion designer (didn't graduate).
 Steven Fulop (born 1977, class of 1995), Mayor of Jersey City.
Ben Jorgensen (born 1983, class of 2001), former lead singer and guitarist of Armor for Sleep.
 Daniel Och (born 1961), businessman and private equity investor.
 Micol Ostow (born 1976, class of 1994), author, editor and educator.
 Adam Pally (born 1982), actor / comedian (didn't graduate).
 Gabe Saporta (born 1979, class of 1997), lead singer of Cobra Starship.
 Joshua Weinstein (born 1983, class of 2001), independent filmmaker who directed the A24 film, Menashe (2017), and the feature documentaries, Driver's Wanted (2012) and Flying on One Engine (2008).

References

External links 

Golda Och Academy
Golda Och Academy, National Center for Education Statistics

1965 establishments in New Jersey
Conservative Jewish day schools
Conservative Judaism in New Jersey
Educational institutions established in 1965
Jewish day schools in New Jersey
Private elementary schools in New Jersey
Private high schools in Essex County, New Jersey
Private middle schools in New Jersey
Schools in Union County, New Jersey
West Orange, New Jersey